Alison Cumings is a former English professional squash player.

Personal life 
Cumings was born on 18 November 1961 in the county of Kent, England. She started playing squash as a junior, developing at Reigate Squash Club. She now lives in Leatherhead, Surrey, under the married name of Alison Malynn.

Professional career 
After winning the British Under-19 title, Cumings developed her career further, eventually reaching a world no. 4 ranking for women squash players. She was also the Women's British National Squash Champion in 1982, and was part of the winning Women's World Team in 1985 in Dublin, where the England team beat New Zealand 2-1.

The successful England team went on to win the 1987 Women's World Team Squash Championships Final in Auckland, New Zealand and the 1989 Women's World Team Squash Championships in Warmond, in the Netherlands.

References

English female squash players
1961 births
Living people
People from Surrey